Kongoni is a Linux distribution that used the free version of the Linux kernel as distributed by the Linux-libre project. Development of the Kongoni project is currently dormant.

Kongoni was a desktop oriented operating system with a strong belief in being free (as in freedom) and aimed to be easy to install, use and customize. Kongoni did not ship with, include or offer the ability to install any software not approved by the Free Software Foundation.

Kongoni is the Shona word for Gnu, the same animal the GNU Project takes its name from. The name was chosen as it represents the spirit and history of Kongoni, a Linux operating system of African origin.

History
Each release of Kongoni was named after great philosophers, including: Aristotle, Sophocles, Nietzsche and Cicero. Each version of Kongoni is compatible with the Slackware release it was based on and can natively install packages for Slackware.

The project is currently dormant. In September 2010, the project was maintained by one developer, Robert Gabriel. Previously, the project was maintained by A.J. Venter.

Features
Kongoni was offered as a live CD, with the option to install the OS to the hard-drive. The Kongoni OS installs software through the use of ports. This allows one to download the source code for a program, as opposed to a pre-compiled binary file, which is then compiled and built automatically on the users system. This offers the benefit of smaller downloads and programs that may run faster and/or use less memory, as they are compiled explicitly for the users own system.

Kongoni shipped with several pieces of unique code, including:
A custom "Kongoni" installer.
KISS (Kongoni Integrated Setup System), which is a simple program for performing common system configuration tasks.
PIG (Ports Installation GUI), an easy to use program for installing and managing programs.

References

External links

Discontinued Linux distributions
Free software only Linux distributions
Slackware
KDE
Linux distributions